Nebraska is a 2013 American comedy-drama road film directed by Alexander Payne, written by Bob Nelson, and starring Bruce Dern, Will Forte, June Squibb and Bob Odenkirk. Shot in black-and-white, the story follows an elderly Montana resident and his son as they try to claim a million-dollar sweepstakes prize on a long trip to Nebraska.

The film was nominated for the Palme d'Or (Grand Prize) at the 2013 Cannes Film Festival, where Dern won the Best Actor Award. It was also nominated for six Oscars, including Best Picture, Best Director, Best Actor for Dern, Best Supporting Actress for Squibb, Best Original Screenplay, and Best Cinematography. The film was acclaimed by critics and became a commercial success, bringing in $27.7 million from the box office on a $13.5 million budget. It was the final film to be released by Paramount Vantage, as it merged with its parent company Paramount Pictures.

Plot
In Billings, Montana, a police officer discovers Woody Grant walking dangerously on the shoulder of the roadway and takes him to the local police station. Woody is picked up by his son David, who learns that Woody wants to go to Lincoln, Nebraska, to collect a million dollar sweepstakes prize he believes he has won. When David sees the sweepstakes letter, he knows immediately that it is a mail scam designed to get gullible people to purchase magazine subscriptions. David brings his father home, where his mother Kate becomes increasingly annoyed by Woody's insistence on collecting the money.

After Woody is picked up again trying to get to Nebraska, David and his brother Ross discuss putting Woody in a retirement home. Ross is especially frustrated because their Dad didn't put any effort into parenting them and used to drink a lot. He doesn't feel they 'owe' their father anything.

David is visited by his ex-girlfriend, Noelle, who returns his belongings and refuses to move back in with him. Their conversation is cut short by a call from Kate reporting that Woody has taken off once again. David retrieves Woody and decides to drive him all the way to Lincoln, much to Kate's dismay and anger.

While in Rapid City, South Dakota, Woody goes on a bender and hits his head while stumbling back to their motel room. David takes him to the hospital to get his head stitched up. The doctor wants to observe Woody for a day and when he hears about Woody's 'win' he says that'll cover the hospital fees. David learns that they will be passing through Woody's hometown of Hawthorne, Nebraska, and suggests they spend the night with Woody's family. Woody is against the idea, but they end up going anyway.

They stay with Woody's brother Ray, his wife Martha, and their two sons, Cole and Bart. Woody and David visit a mechanic shop Woody once co-owned, followed by some drinks at a bar. Woody pressures David into having a beer. When David was six his Dad had let him drink beer thinking it harmless. David brings up Woody's alcoholism and problems within the family — with Woody implying that he fell into marriage and did not discuss having children with Kate; he just liked 'screwing' — they get into an argument.

At another bar, they meet Ed Pegram, whom the family blames for stealing Woody's air compressor decades ago. But Woody previously said he had sold the garage to Ed. Over David's objections, Woody mentions winning the money and the barflies toast his good fortune. The next day, they learn that the news has spread through the town like wildfire.

Kate arrives by bus in Hawthorne, where David escorts his parents to the cemetery. Kate pays her respects there while providing some colorful history on Woody's relatives, particularly their sex lives. A local newspaper owner wants to run a story about Woody and his sweepstakes "victory." She is an old girlfriend of Woody's and provides David with some background about his father. That night, Ed corners David in the men's room about some money Ed loaned Woody years ago that he wants back, threatening legal action.

The rest of Woody's family, including Ross, come to visit him. Cole and Bart, along with others, approach David and Ross about their share of the money that they believe Woody owes them. A fight begins, ending abruptly with Kate calling out the relatives for their own unpaid debts. David, Kate, Ross and Woody tour the latter's childhood home, which has fallen into disrepair. They drive past a house Kate identifies as Ed's, so David and Ross conspire to steal back the air compressor. Kate soon realizes that the house actually belongs to another couple. She distracts the homeowners so David and Ross can quickly return the stolen compressor.

At the bar, asking Woody for money, Ed reveals that Woody cheated on Kate before David's birth. As they leave, they are attacked by a masked Bart and Cole, who escape with the sweepstakes letter. They later tell David they threw it away after finding out it was a scam. Nevertheless, David and Woody go searching for it. They enter a bar where they find Ed reading the letter aloud to the other patrons, humiliating Woody. After Woody takes the letter back and goes outside, David punches Ed in the face.

Woody has repeatedly said he wants to buy a truck with the money. He cannot drive any more, but Woody tells his son that he also wants to leave something for his family when he dies. David says that they are not going to Lincoln, at which point Woody collapses. David takes him to the hospital in Norfolk. In the middle of the night, Woody abruptly leaves and starts walking, so David relents and drives Woody to Lincoln.

They arrive at the marketing agency, where they are told that Woody did not have the winning number. He is given a consolation gift of a hat that reads "Prize Winner". David goes to an auto dealership and trades in his Subaru for a late-model truck that his father always wanted, along with a new Craftsman air compressor. While driving back through Hawthorne, David hides below the dash and lets Woody take the wheel for all to see. Among them is Woody's former flame who smiles at him, a nonplussed Ed with a black eye, and Woody's brother Albert. Woody waves goodbye and drives out of town, then stops in the middle of the road and switches seats with David, who takes them the rest of the way back home.

Cast
 Bruce Dern as Woodrow T. "Woody" Grant, David and Ross' father, and Kate's husband
 Will Forte as David Grant, Woody and Kate's youngest son, and Ross' brother
 June Squibb as Kate Grant, Woody's wife, and Ross and David's mother
 Bob Odenkirk as Ross Grant, Woody and Kate's oldest son, David's brother and a local television news anchor
 Stacy Keach as Ed Pegram, Woody's former business partner
 Mary Louise Wilson as Aunt Martha, Woody's sister-in-law
 Angela McEwan as Peg Nagy, Woody's former girlfriend
 Rance Howard as Uncle Ray, one of Woody's brothers
 Devin Ratray as Cole, Ray and Martha's son
 Tim Driscoll as Bart, Ray and Martha's son
 Melinda Simonsen as the Receptionist in Lincoln

Production

Screenplay
While working on About Schmidt, Payne received Nelson's screenplay from Albert Berger and Ron Yerxa, asking him to recommend a director. He asked to direct it himself, but did not want to follow up one road trip film (Sideways, on which he was in pre-production) with another. He decided to wait until after completing The Descendants to begin work on the film. This was the first film of Payne's in which he was not directly involved in the writing process, and he rewrote only a few things prior to the beginning of filming.

Casting
After first reading the script, Payne thought of Bruce Dern for the role of Woody Grant. As casting for the film began, Payne met with over fifty actors. Because Paramount demanded a big star, Gene Hackman, Robert De Niro, Robert Duvall, Jack Nicholson and Robert Forster, were initially short listed for the role. Hackman and Nicholson retired from acting, and Duvall and De Niro declined their role. Payne eventually considered Dern again. The director chose this actor because, as he said:

The role of David Grant was desired by several notable Hollywood actors. Bryan Cranston read for the role, but Payne considered him a bad fit. Other considered candidates including Paul Rudd, Casey Affleck and Matthew Modine, who spoke publicly of being considered. Payne later selected Will Forte, despite rumors that a high-profile actor was wanted. He stated:

Filming
The film was shot with Arri Alexa digital cameras and Panavision C-Series anamorphic lenses. The film's lighting was designed to accommodate black and white screening, and was converted from color to black and white in post-production because Payne said he wanted to produce an "iconic, archetypal look". According to cinematographer Phedon Papamichael, the choice was to use "the poetic power of the black and white in combination with these landscapes and of course the landscapes are playing a huge role in this story". The choice of black and white was made against distributor Paramount Vantage's wishes, though a color master of the film was also produced in an effort to satisfy the concerns; Payne said that he hopes no one ever sees it. Despite this, the network Epix announced in August 2014 that it would show the color version as a "limited time showing".

Nebraska started filming in locations in its namesake state in November 2012. Filming moved to Billings, Montana; Buffalo, Wyoming; and Rapid City, South Dakota, and wrapped in December after a 35-day shoot. Nebraska communities where filming took place include Allen, Battle Creek, Elgin, Hooper, Lincoln, Lyons, Madison, Norfolk, Osmond, Pierce, Plainview, Stanton, and Tilden.  The premiere in the namesake state was in Norfolk on November 25, 2013.

Music
The film score to Nebraska was composed by Tin Hat member Mark Orton. The score also includes performances by other members of Tin Hat, marking the first time the three original members had reunited since 2005. A soundtrack album was released by Milan Records on November 19, 2013.

Reception

On review aggregator website Rotten Tomatoes the film holds an approval rating of 91% based on 256 reviews, with an average rating of 8.00/10. The site's critical consensus reads, "Elegant in its simplicity and poetic in its message, Nebraska adds another stirringly resonant chapter to Alexander Payne's remarkable filmography." On Metacritic, film has a weighted average score of 86 out of 100, based on 46 critics, indicating "universal acclaim".

In his review following the Cannes Film Festival, Robbie Collin at The Daily Telegraph gave the film four stars out of five, describing it as "a bittersweet elegy for the American extended family, shot in a crisp black-and-white that chimes neatly with the film's concern for times long past." He also said the film was "a resounding return to form for Payne". Peter Bradshaw at The Guardian wrote that Payne had "returned to a more natural and personal movie language", and praised Dern's performance. Joe Morgenstern of The Wall Street Journal noted that "Bruce Dern's portrait of the boozy old coot is a wonder, as well as the capstone, thus far, of that singular actor's career." Writing for Roger Ebert's website, Christy Lemire commented, “The film's starkly beautiful final images have a poignancy that might leave a lump in your throat.”

Accolades

Nebraska has received several awards and nominations since its release. The American Film Institute included it in their Top Ten Films of the Year. The cast won Best Ensemble from the Boston Society of Film Critics, while Squibb won Best Supporting Actress. Nebraska has received five Golden Globe nominations. It also earned six nominations from the Independent Spirit Awards. Dern and Forte won Best Actor and Best Supporting Actor respectively at the National Board of Review. Nebraska has gathered three Satellite Award nominations and has won Best Cast and Best Supporting Actress for Squibb. The film received two nominations from the Screen Actors Guild Awards.

See also
 List of black-and-white films produced since 1970
 Publishers Clearing House

References

External links

 
 
 
 
 

2013 films
2010s English-language films
2010s adventure comedy-drama films
2010s road comedy-drama films
American adventure comedy-drama films
American black-and-white films
American road comedy-drama films
Films about old age
Films about dysfunctional families
Films directed by Alexander Payne
Films scored by Mark Orton
Films set in Montana
Films set in Nebraska
Films set in South Dakota
Films shot in Montana
Films shot in Nebraska
Films shot in South Dakota
Films shot in Wyoming
FilmNation Entertainment films
Paramount Vantage films
2013 comedy films
2013 drama films
Films about father–son relationships
2010s American films